
Gmina Szydłowo is a rural gmina (administrative district) in Mława County, Masovian Voivodeship, in east-central Poland. Its seat is the village of Szydłowo, which lies approximately 6 kilometres (3 mi) south-east of Mława and 102 km (63 mi) north-west of Warsaw.

Villages
Gmina Szydłowo contains the villages and settlements of Budy Garlińskie, Dębsk, Garlino, Giednia, Kluszewo, Korzybie, Kozły-Janowo, Krzywonoś, Marianowo, Młodynin, Nieradowo, Nosarzewo Borowe, Nosarzewo Polne, Nowa Sławogóra, Nowa Wieś, Nowe Nosarzewo, Nowe Piegłowo, Pawłowo, Piegłowo-Kolonia, Piegłowo-Wieś, Stara Sławogóra, Stare Niemyje, Szydłówek, Szydłowo, Trzcianka, Trzcianka-Kolonia, Tyszki-Bregendy, Wola Dębska and Zalesie.

Neighbouring gminas
Gmina Szydłowo is bordered by the town of Mława and by the gminas of Dzierzgowo, Grudusk, Stupsk, Wieczfnia Kościelna and Wiśniewo.

References

Polish official population figures 2006

Szydlowo
Mława County